The Avro 521 was a British two-seat fighter first flown in late 1915, based on the 504. Only a prototype of the Avro 521 was built. It was powered by a 110 hp (80 kW) Clerget engine, with provision for a .303 in (7.7 mm) Lewis Gun in the rear cockpit.

Operational history
The prototype underwent trials with the RFC in early 1916, and 25 aircraft were subsequently ordered. However, this contract was cancelled, and there is no evidence of any other Avro 521 being built. The prototype crashed at Central Flying School Upavon on 21 September 1916, killing pilot Lieutenant W.H.S. Garnett.

Specifications

References

Bibliography
 William Green and  Gordon Swanborough. The Complete Book of Fighters.  Colour Library Direct, Godalming, UK: 1994. . 
 Jackson, A.J. Avro Aircraft since 1908. London:Putnam, 1990. .

1910s British fighter aircraft
521
Biplanes
Aircraft first flown in 1915
Rotary-engined aircraft